Shchyolkovsky/Shchelkovsky (masculine), Shchyolkovskaya/Shchelkovskaya, or Shchyolkovskoye/Shchelkovskoye (neuter) may refer to:
Shchyolkovsky District, a district of Moscow Oblast, Russia
Shchyolkovskaya, a station of the Moscow Metro, Moscow, Russia